Itchin Stoke Down is a rural location near the town of Alresford in Hampshire. It was used as a venue for 13 first-class cricket matches between 1778 and 1806 and as the home of the Alresford Cricket Club.

Itchin Stoke Down is first referenced as the venue for the Hambledon Club v Hambledon Parish match in May 1778. The first first-class match known to have taken place on the Down was between Hampshire and All-England in July of the same year.

The Down was used as an occasional venue by Hampshire teams from then until the beginning of the 19th century and it survived the Hambledon Club. It was still in use for a Hampshire v All-England match as late as 1806, which was several years after the demise of Hambledon.

References

1778 establishments in England
Cricket grounds in Hampshire
Cricket in Hampshire
Defunct cricket grounds in England
Defunct sports venues in Hampshire
English cricket venues in the 18th century
History of Hampshire
Sport in Hampshire
Sports venues completed in 1778
Sports venues in Hampshire
New Alresford